Rabbitkettle Hot Springs is a naturally occurring hot spring located in the Northwest Territories of Canada. The springs are found in the Nahanni National Park Reserve, along the South Nahanni River. Rabbitkettle Hot Springs are situated on a limestone plateau and comprise two large travertine mounds. The South Mound has grown into a nearby hillside and is not as tall. They are the only tufa mounds in the world known to be located on permafrost. The mounds are multi-colored and tiered.

The name Rabbitkettle comes from the Dene word gahnhthah, meaning "kettle". The translation was adopted by English-speaking locals as "Rabbitkettle", from the peculiar shapes of the basins in the area. The springs were considered a sacred place to the Dene, who left offerings such as tobacco to ensure good fortune.

Formation 

The water emerges in a central pool at the top of the mound and flows downward through a terrace of surrounding pools. The spring water is rich in dissolved minerals from the limestone, such as calcium carbonate. These minerals are deposited on any surface the water flows over, gradually coating it and forming tufa structures known as rimstone dams and gours. Eventually, the older pools begin to fill with deposited minerals, which causes the water to spill over the edges and form new pools.

The pools were formed after the end of the last glacial period, some 10,000 years ago, when the continental ice caps retreated.

Visitors 
Due to the fragile nature of the tufa structures, tourists are only permitted to visit the hot springs with guided tours run by park staff. Visitors must remove their shoes and walk barefoot on a prescribed path to get close to the North Mound.

See also 
 Virginia Falls (Northwest Territories)
 Rabbitkettle Formation

References 

Hot springs of Canada
Landforms of the Northwest Territories
Nahanni National Park Reserve
Volcanism of the Northwest Territories